Tamás Giák (born 2 April 1990 in Miskolc) is a Hungarian footballer who currently plays for BTE Felsozsolca.

External links
Profile at HLSZ

1990 births
Living people
Sportspeople from Miskolc
Hungarian footballers
Association football goalkeepers
Diósgyőri VTK players